Qarah Aghaj (also Romanized as Qarah Āghāj and Qareh Āghāj; also known as Qara Agāch, Qara Aghāch, Qareh Āqāj, and Qarah Aghaj Bazar (Persian: قره آغاج بازار), also Romanized as Qarah Āghāj Bāzār and Qareh Āghāj Bāzār) is a city in the Central District of Charuymaq County, East Azerbaijan province, Iran, and serves as capital of the county. At the 2006 census, its population was 4,157 in 936 households. The following census in 2011 counted 5,652 people in 1,346 households. The latest census in 2016 showed a population of 6,102 people in 1,662 households.

References 

Charuymaq County

Cities in East Azerbaijan Province

Populated places in East Azerbaijan Province

Populated places in Charuymaq County